Kit Carson is one of the earliest Western films, being released by the American Mutoscope and Biograph Company in October 1903. (According to silentera.com, portions may have been released the month before.) Part of the footage was reused in The Pioneers, another Western short also released by Biograph in October 1903. Both films were shot on location in the Adirondack Mountains of New York.

Plot
Kit Carson and another trapper are attacked by Indians in the wilderness; Carson is taken prisoner and his companion killed. He escapes, but is recaptured and taken to his captors' village. There, a maiden takes pity on him and cuts his bonds, enabling him to escape again and return home to his loving family.

References

External links
 
 
 Kit Carson at silentera.com, with a detailed synopsis from "Biograph promotional materials"

1903 films
1903 Western (genre) films
1903 short films
American black-and-white films
American silent short films
Biograph Company films
Films directed by Wallace McCutcheon Sr.
Films shot in New York (state)
Silent American Western (genre) films
1900s American films